This list of Brigham Young University–Idaho buildings catalogs the current and no-longer-existent structures of Brigham Young University–Idaho (BYU–Idaho), a private, coeducational university owned by the Church of Jesus Christ of Latter-day Saints (LDS Church) located in Rexburg, Idaho, United States.

Academic facilities

Administrative buildings

Athletic and outdoor recreation facilities

Auxiliary buildings

Physical Plant buildings

Residential buildings
Residential buildings at Brigham Young University–Idaho include:

Former buildings

Notes

 Blank cells indicate missing information
 "Abbr." = abbreviation; "Yr. Occ." = Year occupied; "Yr. Vac." = Year vacated

References

External links
Maps of Brigham Young University–Idaho

Lists of university and college buildings in the United States
Buildings
Buildings and structures in Madison County, Idaho
Lists of university and college residences in the United States
BYU-Idaho